Northwest Heights is a neighborhood on the west side of Portland.

Parks and recreation 
Forest Heights Park, Forest Park, and Mill Pond Park.

Education 
Forest Park Elementary School, West Sylvan Middle School, East Sylvan Middle School, and Lincoln High School.

Neighborhoods in Portland, Oregon
Northwest Portland, Oregon